Steblów  (German Stöblau) is a village in the administrative district of Gmina Krapkowice, within Krapkowice County, Opole Voivodeship, in south-western Poland.

The village has a population of 1,100.

References

Villages in Krapkowice County